Sheila L. Skemp is an American historian. She is the Clare Leslie Marquette Professor of American History at the University of Mississippi.

Education 
Skemp is originally from Illinois. She has a B.A. from the University of Montana (1967) and earned her Ph.D. from the University of Iowa (1974). She moved to the University of Mississippi in 1980 where she was named the Clare Leslie Marquette Professor of American History in 2008. She led the Sarah Isom Center for Women at the University of Mississippi from 1998 until 2000. She retire in 2014.

Awards and honors 
Skemp was honored by the University of Mississippi as the first person named Outstanding Teacher in Liberal Arts in 1985. In 2018 the University of Montana honored Skemp as a distinguished alumni.

Selected publications

References

Living people
University of Iowa alumni
University of Montana alumni
University of Mississippi faculty
American historians
Women historians
Year of birth missing (living people)